Oxalis luteola  is an Oxalis species found in South Africa. It was first described in 1794.

References

External links

luteola